James S. Turley is an American business executive. He was chairman and chief executive officer of Ernst & Young from 2001 to 2013. He was the National President of the Boy Scouts of America from 2018 to 2019.

Early life and education
Turley received a B.A. and a M.A. in accounting from Rice University.

Career
In 1977, Turley joined Ernst & Young in the US firm's Houston office and served as chairman and CEO from July 2001 to June 2013.

Turley has co-chaired the Russia Foreign Investment Advisory Council and has served on the board of directors of Citigroup, Emerson Electric, Intrexon, Northrop Grumman Corporation, Boy Scouts of America, Catalyst, the National Corporate Theater Fund, and on the board of trustees of his alma mater, Rice University.

He has been a member of the Business Roundtable, International Business Leaders' Advisory Council for the Mayor of Shanghai and Transatlantic Business Dialogue. Turley was the chair of the governing board of the U.S. Center for Audit Quality in 2007–2011. In 2010, he was appointed by Barack Obama to the President's Export Council.

In 2013, Turley was the 4th highest-rated CEO with an approval rating of 96% as calculated by Glassdoor.

Personal life
Turley is married to Lynne Pounds from Kirkwood, a suburb of St. Louis, Missouri. He and his wife have one adult son James "Jay" Stanton Turley Jr.

Turley plays tennis and golf.

Upon Turley's retirement, Rice University’s Jones School announced the launch of the James S. Turley-Ernst & Young Leadership Development Initiative that focusses on accounting education. In conjunction with this, the university received a $2.5 million gift that includes $1 million from Turley, $500,000 from Ernst & Young and $1 million from Ernst & Young Rice alumni and various partner donations in honor of Turley.

Politics
In 2012, Turley was the first member of the Boy Scouts of America Executive Board to come out in public disapproval of its policy of excluding gays. The following year, the policy was reversed, allowing gay youths to join the organisation.

References

Living people
Rice University alumni
American chief executives of financial services companies
Year of birth missing (living people)
Ernst & Young people
Place of birth missing (living people)
National Executive Board of the Boy Scouts of America members
Presidents of the Boy Scouts of America